Peter D. Leary is an American lawyer who serves as the United States attorney for the Middle District of Georgia since 2020.

Early life and education

Leary was raised in Watkinsville, Georgia. He received a Bachelor of Arts from the University of Virginia in 2000 and a Juris Doctor from the University of Virginia School of Law in 2005, where he was a Jefferson Scholar.

Career 

He served a law clerk for Judge Hugh Lawson of the United States District Court for the Middle District of Georgia from 2005 to 2007. From 2007 to 2012, he served as a trial attorney in the federal programs branch of the Department of Justice's Civil Division. He previously served as an assistant United States attorney for the Middle District of Georgia from 2012 to 2021. Leary serves as adjunct faculty at Mercer University School of Law, teaching criminal justice.

U.S. attorney for the Middle District of Georgia

Appointment 

On December 14, 2020, Leary was appointed the acting U.S. attorney after the resignation of Charles Peeler. On March 17, 2022, he was appointed as the U.S. attorney by Chief District Judge Marc T. Treadwell.

Nomination and confirmation 
On October 19, 2022, President Joe Biden announced his intent to nominate Leary to be the United States attorney for the Middle District of Georgia. On November 14, 2022, his nomination was sent to the United States Senate. On November 17, 2022, his nomination was reported out of committee by a voice vote, with Senators Josh Hawley and Marsha Blackburn voting no on record. On December 6, 2022, his nomination was confirmed in the Senate by voice vote. He was sworn in by Chief District Judge Marc T. Treadwell on December 12, 2022.

References

Living people
Year of birth missing (living people)
21st-century American lawyers
Assistant United States Attorneys
Georgia (U.S. state) lawyers
Mercer University faculty
People from Watkinsville, Georgia
United States Attorneys for the Middle District of Georgia
United States Department of Justice lawyers
University of Virginia alumni
University of Virginia School of Law alumni